Aussie Pickers is an Australian reality television series which premiered on A&E on 9 May 2013. It is an Australian adaption of American series American Pickers. The show follows Lucas Callaghan and Adam McDonald as they travel around Australia, buying  ("picking") antiques and collectibles. They look through attics, backyards and sheds in the search for forgotten relics.

Development
The series was first commissioned by Foxtel (owner of A&E) on 12 November 2012, to be a 10-part series produced by Shine Australia.

On 10 December 2012, it was announced that Lucas Callaghan and Adam McDonald would host the series, as well as stating the series had been reduced from 10 episodes to 8.

In February 2014, multiple regional websites and newspapers advertised that Aussie Pickers were looking for individuals to nominate whether they were interested in participating in the series, with filming of season two to begin shortly and to air on A&E later in 2014. It was later announced the second season would premiere on 14 August 2014, however, the series premiered two days earlier on 12 August 2014.

Presenters
Lucas Callaghan is an Australian collector and dealer in 20th century design Callaghan also stars in a 2019 spin-off series Road to Riches, where he is invited into homes  to identify household valuable antiques and collectables. Adam McDonald's area of expertise is 20th-century and industrial antiques, and his work has been reviewed on the ABC television program Auction Room.

Episodes

Series overview

Season 1 (2013)

Season 2 (2014)

Home media

References

External links
 Official Website
 Production Website

A&E (Australian TV channel) original programming
2013 Australian television series debuts
2014 Australian television series endings
2010s Australian reality television series
Antiques television series
English-language television shows
Television shows filmed in Australia